Thomas Wyer (1789 – December 23, 1848) was a political figure in New Brunswick. He represented Charlotte in the Legislative Assembly of New Brunswick from 1827 to 1840.

He was the son of Thomas Wyer, a United Empire Loyalist who came to St. Andrews, New Brunswick from Falmouth (later Portland, Maine), and Joanna Pote. Wyer served as a justice in the Court of Common Pleas, as a lieutenant in the militia, as commissioner of wrecks and as a member of the board of education. In 1840, Wyer was named to the Legislative Council of New Brunswick.

His daughter Susan married George Dixon Street, who also represented Charlotte in the assembly.

References 

1789 births
1848 deaths
Members of the Legislative Assembly of New Brunswick
Members of the Legislative Council of New Brunswick
Colony of New Brunswick people
Colony of New Brunswick judges